Citrate lyase beta like is a protein that in humans is encoded by the CLYBL gene.

References

Further reading